SND College of Engineering and Research Centre Yeola is an engineering school in Yeola, Nashik district, Maharashtra, India.  It is run by the Jagdamba Education Society (JES).

History

SND College of Engineering, yeola was started in 2006. Courses in Computer, Electronics, Mechanical and Electrical Engineering branches were started first but now IT and Civil are added to its Departments. In 2010, SND College of Engineering, yeola produced its first graduating class and many were placed into reputable organizations.

Campus

Courses offered

Bachelor degree courses
 Mechanical Engineering (180)
 Computer Engineering (60)
 Civil Engineering (60)
 Electrical Engineering (60)
 Information Technology (60)

Postgraduate courses
 Masters in Civil Engineering (Structural Engg.) (24)
 Masters in Electrical Engineering (Electrical Power System) (24)
 Masters in Electrical Engineering (Design Engg.) (18)
 Masters in Computer Engineering(18)
 MBA

Research groups 
 WINGS is the Wireless Innovation Group, a wireless research group of Ph. D holders.
The college also offers internship for pg students

Science and Technology Entrepreneurs Park
The Product Development Centre identifies students’ projects that are commercially viable and develop them into prototypes and test for reliability. The product is offered to the students, employees or even outsiders for being commercially exploited.

References

External links 
 

Engineering colleges in Maharashtra
Education in Nashik district
Educational institutions established in 2006
2006 establishments in Maharashtra